Malinformation is information that is true and factual, but it is intentionally conveyed in order to inflict actual harm or cause the imminent threat of actual harm on a person, organisation or country. Examples of malinformation include phishing, doxing, and swatting. Malinformation should refer to true and factual information that is intentionally conveyed by the disseminator in a way that causes actual harm or imminent threat of actual harm against another person.

References 

Deception